is a passenger railway station in the city of  Kamogawa, Chiba Prefecture, Japan, operated by the East Japan Railway Company (JR East).

Lines
Futomi Station is served by the Uchibo Line, and is located 116.0 kilometers from the terminus of the Uchibō Line at Soga Station.

Station layout
Futomi Station has two opposed side platforms serving two tracks. The station is unattended.

Platforms

History
Futomi Station was opened on July 25, 1924. The station was absorbed into the JR East network upon the privatization of the Japan National Railways (JNR) on April 1, 1987.

Passenger statistics
In fiscal 2018, the station was used by an average of 63 passengers daily (boarding passengers only).

Surrounding area
 Niemonjima

See also
 List of railway stations in Japan
 Ishikari-Futomi Station, a railway station on the Sasshō Line in Hokkaidō.

References

External links

 JR East Station information  

Railway stations in Chiba Prefecture
Railway stations in Japan opened in 1924
Uchibō Line
Kamogawa, Chiba